The  Las Vegas Outlaws season was the first  and only season for the expansion franchise in the Arena Football League. The team was coached by Aaron Garcia and played their home games at Thomas & Mack Center. The Outlaws finished their inaugural season 5–12–1, with the tie being a cancelled home game against the VooDoo. Though they qualified for the playoffs, the league announced on August 9 that the Outlaws (along with the VooDoo) would cease operations effective immediately, and would therefore not participate in the playoffs.

Offseason

2014 expansion draft

Standings

Schedule

Regular season
The 2015 regular season schedule was released on December 19, 2014.

Roster

References

Las Vegas Outlaws
Las Vegas Outlaws
Las Vegas Outlaws (arena football)